The Paitanic languages are a group of languages spoken in Sabah (Borneo) Several go by the name Lobu.

Languages
The Paitanic languages are:
 Tombonuwo, Kinabatangan, Abai Sungai, Serudung.

Dumpas may also belong here. Furthermore, Lobel (2013:399-400) classifies Murut Serudung as a Paitanic language.

Lobel (2016)
Lobel (2016) covers the following Paitanic languages:
Sungai Beluran
Lingkabau
Lobu Tampios
Lobu Lanas
Sungai Kuamut
Murut Serudong

References

Lobel, Jason William. 2013. Philippine and North Bornean languages: issues in description, subgrouping, and reconstruction. Ph.D. dissertation. Manoa: University of Hawai'i at Manoa.
Lobel, Jason William. 2016. North Borneo Sourcebook: Vocabularies and Functors. University of Hawaii Press.